Bastian Hohmann (born 9 August 1990) is a German former professional footballer who played as a midfielder or winger.

Career
Hohmann started his senior career with SV Germania Schöneiche. In 2012, he signed for C.D. Feirense in the Portuguese LigaPro, where he made two appearances and scored zero goals. After that, he played for Vasas SC and Erzgebirge Aue.

He joined Berliner Dynamo in 2015.

References

External links 
 Bastian Hohmann, professional soccer player (1)
 Bastian Hohmann, professional soccer player (2)
 Hohmann: A Brandenburger in Portugal 
 A Brandenburger storms in Portugal  
 Definitely further developed in terms of sport

Living people
1990 births
German footballers
Footballers from Berlin
Association football wingers
Regionalliga players
Liga Portugal 2 players
SV Germania Schöneiche players
C.D. Feirense players
Vasas SC players
FC Erzgebirge Aue players
Berliner FC Dynamo players
German expatriate footballers
German expatriate sportspeople in Hungary
Expatriate footballers in Hungary
German expatriate sportspeople in Portugal
Expatriate footballers in Portugal